Tell It to Sweeney is a 1927 American comedy silent film directed by Gregory La Cava and written by Monte Brice, Kerry Clarke, George Marion Jr. and Percy Heath. The film stars Chester Conklin, George Bancroft, Jack Luden, Doris Hill, Frank Bond and William H. Tooker. The film was released on September 24, 1927, by Paramount Pictures.

Cast   
Chester Conklin as Luke Beamish
George Bancroft as Cannonball Casey
Jack Luden as Jack Sweeney
Doris Hill	as Doris Beamish
Frank Bond as Supt. Dugan 
William H. Tooker as Old Man Sweeney

References

External links 
 

1927 films
1920s English-language films
Silent American comedy films
1927 comedy films
Paramount Pictures films
Films directed by Gregory La Cava
American black-and-white films
American silent feature films
1920s American films